1,2,3,4,5-Pentamethylcyclopentadiene is a cyclic diene with the formula C5Me5H (Me = CH3).  1,2,3,4,5-Pentamethylcyclopentadiene is the precursor to the ligand 1,2,3,4,5-pentamethylcyclopentadienyl, which is often denoted Cp* (C5Me5) and read as "C P star", the "star" signifying the five methyl groups radiating from the core of the ligand. In contrast to less-substituted cyclopentadiene derivatives, Cp*H is not prone to dimerization.

Synthesis
Pentamethylcyclopentadiene is commercially available. It was first prepared from tiglaldehyde via 2,3,4,5-tetramethylcyclopent-2-enone.

Alternatively, 2-butenyllithium adds to ethyl acetate followed by acid-catalyzed dehydrocyclization:

Organometallic derivatives
Cp*H is a precursor to organometallic compounds containing the  ligand, commonly called Cp*−.

Some representative reactions leading to such Cp*–metal complexes follow:
Deprotonation with  n-butyllithium:
Cp*H   +  C4H9Li →   Cp*Li  +  C4H10
Synthesis of (pentamethylcyclopentadienyl)titanium trichloride:
Cp*Li  + TiCl4 →   Cp*TiCl3  + LiCl
Synthesis of (pentamethylcyclopentadienyl)iron dicarbonyl dimer from iron pentacarbonyl:
2 Cp*H  +  2 Fe(CO)5]]   →   [η5-Cp*Fe(CO)2]2  +  H2  +  6 CO
This method is analogous to the route to the related Cp complex, see cyclopentadienyliron dicarbonyl dimer.

Some Cp* complexes are prepared using silyl transfer: 
Cp*Li + Me3SiCl → Cp*SiMe3 + LiCl
Cp*SiMe3 + TiCl4 → Cp*TiCl3 + Me3SiCl

An instructive but obsolete route to Cp* complexes involves the use of hexamethyl Dewar benzene.  This method was traditionally used for preparation of the chloro-bridged dimers [Cp*IrCl2]2 and [Cp*RhCl2]2, but has been discontinued with the increased commercial availability of Cp*H.  Such syntheses rely on a hydrohalic acid induced rearrangement of hexamethyl Dewar benzene to a substituted pentamethylcyclopentadiene prior to reaction with the hydrate of either iridium(III) chloride or rhodium(III) chloride.

Comparison to other Cp ligands
Complexes of pentamethylcyclopentadienyl differ in several ways from the more common cyclopentadienyl (Cp) derivatives.  Being more electron-rich, Cp*− is a stronger donor and dissociation, like ring-slippage, is more difficult with Cp* than with Cp.  The fluorinated ligand, (trifluoromethyl)tetramethylcyclopentadienyl, C5Me4CF3, combines the properties of Cp and Cp*: it possesses the steric bulk of Cp* but has electronic properties similar to Cp, the electron-donation from the methyl groups being "canceled out" by the electron-accepting nature of the trifluoromethyl substituent.  Its steric bulk stabilizes complexes with fragile ligands. Its bulk also attenuates intermolecular interactions, decreasing the tendency to form polymeric structures.  Its complexes also tend to be more soluble in non-polar solvents.  The methyl group in Cp* complexes can undergo C–H activation leading to "tuck-in complexes". Bulky cyclopentadienyl ligands are known that are far more sterically encumbered than Cp*.

See also
Methylcyclopentadiene

References

Cyclopentadienes
Ligands